Ork Records: New York, New York is a 2CD/4LP compilation album from punk bands associated with Ork Records in the 1970s. It was released in October 2015 under Numero Group.

Track listing

The 4LP version divided the sides as:
A: 1-1 - 1-5; B: 1-6 - 1-12; C: 1-13 - 1-18; D: 1-19 - 1-24;
E: 2-1 - 2-6; F: 2-7 - 2-14; G: 2-15 - 2-20; H: 2-21 - 2-25.
Editions of 2000 CD boxes and 2000 LP boxes included a 190-page hardcover book, and a bonus Feelies 7" in a numbered sleeve, with the songs "The Boy with Perpetual Nervousness," recorded in the studio, and a cover of Manfred Mann's "My Little Red Book," recorded live at CBGB on December 14, 1977.

References

2015 compilation albums
The Numero Group compilation albums